The Faculty of Dental Medicine and Oral Health Sciences is one of the constituent faculties of McGill University. It became established as a constituent of McGill University in 1904 as the McGill Dental School, a department in the McGill University Faculty of Medicine until becoming its own faculty in 1920. In 2022, the Faculty of Dentistry was renamed as the Faculty of Dental Medicine and Oral Health Sciences to reflect the diversity of research conducted in the Faculty that goes beyond the dental chair. The Faculty is closely affiliated with the Montreal General Hospital, Jewish General Hospital, Montreal Children's Hospital, and McGill University Faculty of Medicine.

It is located in the heart of Downtown Montreal across the Roddick Gates entrance to the McGill campus.

It is the only dental program in the country that integrates MD and DMD education in single classes for the first four semesters of the "Fundamentals of Medicine and Dentistry" curriculum.  It is home to the largest residency program in Canada which consists of three sites Montreal General Hospital, Jewish General Hospital, and Montreal Children's Hospital.

History

The origins of the McGill Faculty of Dental Medicine and Oral Health Sciences are traced to the Dental College of the Province of Quebec in 1892, the second dental school to be established in Canada after the Royal College of Dental Surgeons. As a bilingual professional school, it later became a part of Bishop's University's Faculty of Medicine in 1896.  In 1904, it became the McGill Dental School as a department within the faculty of medicine at McGill as part of its amalgamation of Bishop's University's relatively small faculty of medicine. It officially became its own faculty in the year 1920.

In 2014, the faculty completed an $18.3 million building project to relocate the dental facilities into a new building in the heart of McGill University's downtown campus.

In 2019, the McGill Faculty of Dentistry launched its strategic planning exercise to provide a concrete pathway to achieving its vision for making the Faculty a leader among dental schools around the world. This process also gave direction for planning, programming and implementation of policies, strategies and new initiatives across the Faculty of Dentistry during the five-year period 2021–2026. The strategic planning and revised Faculty vision, mission and value statements were the driving force for finding a new name that reflected how the Faculty has evolved and progressed during its century-long history. On January 3, 2022, the Faculty of Dentistry was renamed as the Faculty of Dental Medicine and Oral Health Sciences.

Curriculum
The faculty offers a Doctor of Medicine in Dentistry (D.M.D.) degree. In keeping with the joint history of the McGill University Faculty of Medicine with the Faculty of Dentistry, the D.M.D. students undertake a joint curriculum with the M.D.,C.M. students in the Fundamentals of Medicine and Dentistry curriculum in the first 18 months of their medical education, along with additional dentistry-related courses. In the second year, when the medical curriculum is complete, dental students transition into a fundamentals of dentistry curriculum followed by practical pre-clinic.

The faculty also confers several graduate level degrees: thesis M.Sc. in Dental Sciences; non-thesis M.Sc. in Dental Sciences; and a Ph.D. in Oral Health Sciences, which are also available to international applicants. In addition to the undergraduate level dental curriculum, there are 3 General Practice Residency (GPR) programs affiliated with the faculty including those at the Montreal General Hospital, Jewish General Hospital, and the Montreal Children's Hospital. The faculty also has a six-year oral and maxillofacial surgery (OMFS)/Doctor of Medicine, Master of Surgery (M.D.,C.M.) program offered at the Montreal General Hospital, a Level-1 Trauma Center. There are approximately 150-160 students enrolled in the undergraduate level (D.M.D.), with an additional ~90 graduate students and 33 in the G.P.R. and M.D.,C.M.-OMFS residency programs.

The Faculty of Dental Medicine and Oral Health Sciences also offers a robust curriculum of continuing education courses accredited by both the American Dental Association’s Continuing Education Recognition Program (ADA-CERP) and the Canadian dental licensing bodies, including as a preferred partner by the Ordre des dentistes du Québec (ODQ).

The D.M.D. and specialty programs at McGill University are accredited by the American Dental Association (ADA) through the Commission on Dental Accreditation (CODA).

Research

The faculty research is concentrated in 4 major areas: pain and neuroscience; mineralized tissues and extracellular matrix biology; biomaterials, nanobiotechnology and tissue engineering; and population oral health. Approximately one-third of all oral health-related research in Canada is performed at McGill despite it being represented by only 5% of the Canadian dentistry professors. It also graduates more dental research graduate students than any other dental school in Canada. McGill's Faculty of Dental Medicine and Oral Health Sciences also produces more per capita research funding to McGill compared to the McGill Faculty of Medicine, despite the faculty's size.

The faculty also hosts its research activities within multiple research sites including at the Faculty of Dental Medicine and Oral Health Sciences building on Sherbrooke, at the Montreal General Hospital, the Jewish General Hospital, the Montreal Children's Hospital, the Strathcona Anatomy & Dentistry Building, the Alan Edwards Pain Management Unit, and at the McGill Faculty of Medicine.

Reputation
The Faculty of Dental Medicine and Oral Health Sciences is notoriously competitive in terms of admissions with an acceptance rate of 3.4% for the 2021 admissions cycle. The number of admissions to the D.M.D. program is approximately 37-38 students annually. For the 2020 admissions cycle, the average accepted Canadian resident cGPA was 3.90. For the last several cycles of admission the average undergraduate cGPA was 3.84 (post-graduate GPA is not considered in admissions) with approximately 8-9 entering students having completed a Masters or Doctorate degree. As of the year 2014, applicants are interviewed via Multiple Mini-Interviews (MMI) held at the McGill University Steinberg Centre for Simulation and Interactive Learning (SCSIL), along with the prospective Faculty of Medicine students. Students are also initially screened prior to interview selection via the CASPer test.

McGill University is ranked as the number 1 medical-doctoral school nationally in Canada by Maclean's for 18 straight years (including the most recent ranking for 2023). McGill Faculty of Dental Medicine and Oral Health Sciences students have the highest rate of residency or specialization in the country with approximately 90% of the graduating students ultimately continuing their education via either specialty or residency.

The Faculty of Dental Medicine and Oral Health Sciences has a wide-ranging community service program offered with funding through the faculty, student fundraising initiatives, and external donors. These programs include the Jim Lund Dental Clinic at the Welcome Hall Mission, the Montreal Children's Hospital Clinic for new immigrants and refugees, the McGill Mobile Dental Clinic,  and the McGill Summer Dental Clinic, which provided a combined $933,735 of free dental care to the underprivileged in the year 2017–2018. The faculty was recently awarded the Gies Award for Outstanding Vision by the American Dental Education Association in 2019.

Notable Alumni and Faculty
 Emma Gaudreau Casgrain
 William George Beers
 Jocelyne Feine
 David Goltzman
 Paul J. Allison

History of Deans
William George Beers 1892 - 1897 
Peter Brown 1902 - 1910 
D. James Berwick 1910 - 1914 
A. W. Thornton 1913 - 1927
Arthur L. Walsh 1935 - 1947
D. Prescott Mowry 1948 - 1952
James McCutcheon 1954 - 1970
Ernest Reynolds Ambrose 1970 - 1977
Kenneth C. Bentley 1977 - 1987
Ralph Barolet 1987 - 1994
James Lund 1994 - 2008
Paul J. Allison 2008 - 2018
Elham Emami 2018 - Present

References

External links
McGill Faculty of Dental Medicine and Oral Health Sciences

D
Dental schools in Canada